Sesame Street, Special is a pledge-drive special that is based on the children's series, Sesame Street. It aired on PBS stations in March 1988 as part of PBS' March fundraiser.

Random House Home Video released the special on VHS in 1994; the release changed the title to Put Down the Duckie and removed the pledge break segment.

Plot
The special begins with Gladys Knight & the Pips performing the Sesame Street theme. Phil Donahue says Sesame Street is a place where everyone can live in perfect harmony. Oscar and the grouches dispute this because there isn't enough trash or arguing and too much cooperating, and Maria says everything is too nice for Oscar, and the street has the right amount of those things. Count von Count agrees that Sesame Street isn't perfect because there isn't enough counting. Ernie says his Rubber Duckie wants to say something, and everyone lets him because the duckie deserves to squeak. A Dinger, a duck and a Honker also want to say something. Linda uses sign language to say that everyone on Sesame Street really likes kids; the Count agrees with Linda but still believes the street needs more counting. Phil leaves Sesame Street and the Count and grouches follow him. The Monsterpiece Theater sketch "The 39 Stairs" is repeated from a previous episode.

Oscar is upset because Bob will sing "The People in Your Neighborhood". Bob is joined by tennis player Martina Navratilova, reporter Barbara Walters, and consumer advocate Ralph Nader. Oscar says he liked the song after it ends. Ernie tells Hoots the Owl that when he tries to play a saxophone, he squeaks his Rubber Duckie, so Hoots sings "Put Down the Duckie" along with several celebrities. Reporter Kermit the Frog wants to know why Oscar likes public television, but he does not like it. Kermit mentions some reasons to like public television, but Oscar prefers the opposites. Kermit believes that Oscar does not like public television and introduces a pledge break. Oscar is interested in it and Kermit says that he can watch it now. After the pledge drive, Oscar says he taped it.

Three sketches from previous episodes are repeated; "Oh, How I Miss My X", "Grover the Singing and Dancing Waiter", and "Sing Your Synonyms". Robert MacNeil hosts a Sesame Street Special Report discussing the "cookiegate affair", where Cookie Monster was accused of stealing Susan and Gordon's cookies; Kermit is Cookie Monster's lawyer. James Taylor performing "Jellyman Kelly" with some kids is repeated from a previous episode. In "Pretty Great Performances", Placido Flamingo and the Sesame Street All-Animal Orchestra sing "Italian Street Song", conducted by Seiji Ozawa. More celebrities sing "Put Down the Duckie" over the credits. In a post-credits scene, Hoots asks Ernie to help him; every time Hoots squeaks his Rubber Duckie, he plays his saxophone too. Ernie tells Hoots, "you gotta put down the saxophone if you wanna squeak your duckie!"

Cast

Humans
 Alison Bartlett as Gina
 Linda Bove as Linda
 Northern Calloway as David
 Emilio Delgado as Luis
 Loretta Long as Susan
 Kermit Love as Willy
 Sonia Manzano as Maria
 Bill McCutcheon as Uncle Wally
 Bob McGrath as Bob
 Chet O'Brien as Mr. Macintosh
 Roscoe Orman as Gordon

Muppet performers
 Caroll Spinney as Big Bird, Oscar the Grouch, and Bruno the Trashman
 Frank Oz as Bert, Cookie Monster, and Grover
 Jerry Nelson as Count Von Count, Mr. Johnson, and Announcer
 Richard Hunt as Placido Flamingo, Additional Muppets
 Martin P. Robinson as Telly, Snuffy, Manolo, Additional Muppets
 Kevin Clash as Elmo, and Hoots the Owl
 Pam Arciero as Grundgetta, Additional Muppets
 Camille Bonora as Additional Muppets
 David Rudman as Female Drummer, Additional Muppets
 Noel MacNeal as Additional Muppets (uncredited)
 Fred Garbo Garver as Barkley, Additional Muppets
 Bryant Young as Additional Muppets
 Jim Henson as Ernie, and Kermit the Frog

Special guest stars
 Carl Banks
 John Candy
 Celia Cruz
 Jane Curtin
 Danny DeVito
 Phil Donahue
 Keith Hernandez
 Mark Ingram II
 Jeremy Irons
 Gordon Jackson
 Madeline Kahn
 Gladys Knight
 Patti LaBelle (archival footage)
 Ladysmith Black Mambazo
 Sean Landeta
 Robert MacNeil
 Wynton Marsalis
 Jean Marsh
 Andrea Martin
 Ralph Nader
 Martina Navratilova
 Karl Nelson
 Seiji Ozawa
 Itzhak Perlman
 Rhea Perlman
 Paul Reubens
 Pete Seeger
 Paul Simon
 James Taylor (archival footage)
 Barbara Walters
 Joe Williams
 Mookie Wilson

References

1988 television specials
PBS original programming
Sesame Street features